The Río Grande de Jayuya is a river of Jayuya and Utuado, Puerto Rico. It is a tributary to the Río Grande de Arecibo river.

History
This was the favorite river and playtime spot of Griselio Torresola as a child. In his later life, Griselio became a Puerto Rican nationalist and was one of the would-be assassins of U.S. President Harry S. Truman in 1950.

Gallery

See also
List of rivers of Puerto Rico

References

External links
 USGS Hydrologic Unit Map – Caribbean Region (1974)
Rios de Puerto Rico

Rivers of Puerto Rico